Stickybear is a fictional character created by Richard Hefter and an edutainment series starring the character headed by Optimum Resource, Inc. The character was a mascot of Weekly Reader Software, a division of Xerox Education Publications.

Software of the series has been released since the early 1980s; software programs originated on the Apple II platform and were released for IBM PC, Atari 8-bit and Commodore 64 platforms.

As of 2008 the most recent Stickybear software was developed for Windows XP/Windows Vista and Mac OS X.

Books with Stickybear
 Babysitter Bears (1983)
 Bears at Work (1983)
 Lots of Little Bears: A Stickybear Counting Book (1983)
 Stickybear Watch Out: The Stickybear Book of Safety (1983)
 Stickybear Book of Weather (1983)
 Where is the Bear? (1983)
 Stickybears Scary Night (1984)

Software with Stickybear
The earliest software programs included picture books in colors and posters.
Stickybear Alphabet (IBM-PC, Apple II) (Some versions included the book The Strawberry Look Book)
Stickybear Numbers
Stickybear Bop
Stickybear Shapes
Stickybear Math (Commodore 64, IBM-PC, Apple II, Philips CD-i)
Stickybear Math 2 (IBM-PC)
Stickybear Opposites (IBM-PC)
Stickybear Reading (Commodore 64, IBM-PC, Philips CD-i)
Stickybear Early Learning Activities (Windows, Apple Macintosh Classic, Windows XP/Windows Vista, Mac OS X
At Home With Stickybear
Stickybear Kindergarten Activities
Stickybear Math 1 Deluxe (Windows XP/Windows Vista, Mac OS X)
Stickybear Spellgrabber (Commodore 64, Mac OS 7)
Stickybear Typing (Commodore 64, IBM-PC)
Stickybear's Reading Room (Mac OS 7)
Stickybear Preschool (Philips CD-i)
Stickybear Family Fun Game (Philips CD-i)

Reception
II Computing listed Stickybear tenth on the magazine's list of top Apple II educational software as of late 1985, based on sales and market-share data.

Peter Mucha of the Houston Chronicle reviewed IBM versions of Stickybear in 1990; Stickybear Opposites received a B−, Stickybear Math received a B, Stickybear Math 2 received a B, Stickybear Alphabet received an A−, and Stickybear Reading received a C.

The New Talking StickyBear Alphabet won the Best Early Education Program 1989 Excellence in Software Award from the Software and Information Industry Association.

Leslie Eiser of Compute! magazine said in a 1992 review that StickyBear Town Builder was dated compared to other games of its time.

Computer Gaming World in 1993 said of Stickybear's Early Learning Activities, "In the world of early learning software, it's difficult to find anyone who does it better."

References

External links

 
 Stickybear ABC for the Apple II at the Internet Archive

Children's educational video games
Video games developed in the United States